Hikutavake is one of the fourteen villages of Niue.  Its population at the 2017 census was 49, up from 40 in 2011.

The village was established by villagers from Tuapa.

Location & geography 
About 95% of the land surface is coral rock.

There is a trail on the north side of Niue that leads to a clifftop to an enclosed reef with natural pools, some of them are 10 metres deep and 25 metres across.

References

Populated places in Niue